Anatoma eximia is a species of minute sea snail, a marine gastropod mollusk or micromollusk in the family Anatomidae.

References

External links
  Serge GOFAS, Ángel A. LUQUE, Joan Daniel OLIVER,José TEMPLADO & Alberto SERRA (2021) - The Mollusca of Galicia Bank (NE Atlantic Ocean); European Journal of Taxonomy 785: 1–114
 To World Register of Marine Species

Anatomidae
Gastropods described in 1877